The first season of the American fictional drama television series ER aired from 1994 to 1995 with 25 episodes. 

The two-hour pilot episode aired on September 19, 1994, and was followed by 24 other episodes, including the season finale that aired on May 18, 1995.

Plot
In ER first season, the core cast consisted of Chief Resident Dr. Mark Greene, pediatric resident Dr. Doug Ross, second-year resident Dr. Susan Lewis, medical student John Carter, head nurse Carol Hathaway, and second-year surgical resident Dr. Peter Benton. 

The series premiere "24 Hours" sees Dr. Greene considering a move into private practice at the request of his wife, Jen. The episode also sees an attempted suicide from staff nurse Carol Hathaway, who had previously been in a long-term relationship with Doug Ross, as well as the first day for medical student John Carter. 

Originally, Carol Hathaway died by suicide, but her death in the pilot was never shown or referred to by other characters, leaving her open for a return.  Audiences responded so well to her character that producers decided to offer Julianna Margulies a permanent spot in the cast. Her love interest in the first season is John "Tag" Taglieri. 

One of the major events this season is a blizzard that sends multiple patients to County General.
  
Also over the course of the season, Dr. Greene's marriage begins to disintegrate. At work, he experiences problems, after making a fatal error in the treatment of a pregnant woman in the Emmy-winning episode "Love's Labor Lost." He falls into a depression.     

Meanwhile, a lovelorn Ross struggles to come to terms with the fact that a recovered Hathaway is moving on with her life while Dr. Lewis tries to cope with her rebellious sister, Chloe, who becomes pregnant and gives birth to a daughter at the end of the season. Lewis also struggles professionally with cardiologist Dr. Kayson and romantically with mentally unstable psychiatrist Dr. Div Cvetic.    

Carter comes to grips with the fast-paced life of an ER doctor, while trying to win the approval of his demanding supervising resident, Dr. Peter Benton. Hathaway gets back on her feet in the aftermath of her suicide attempt; she gets engaged and tries to adopt an HIV-positive Russian orphan, but is denied  due to her suicide attempt. On her wedding day, her fiancé, Dr. John Taglieri, questions the strength of her love for him.  She admits she does not love him as much as he loves her, and he leaves her shortly before the ceremony. 

Dr. Benton is forced to cope with his busy surgical schedule, while caring for his ailing mother. After her death, he becomes romantically involved with her physical therapist Jeanie Boulet.

Production
The series pilot was executive produced by Michael Crichton and John Wells, Dennis Murphy produced the pilot episode and Wendy Spence Rosato served as associate producer. Crichton, Wells, and Spence-Rosato continued these roles for the series proper while Murphy was replaced as producer by Christopher Chulack. Also joining the production team were Mimi Leder, Robert Nathan, and Lydia Woodward as supervising producers and Paul Manning as Co-producer.

Crichton wrote the series pilot and is credited as the creator of the series for the rest of the season. Producers Wells, Nathan, Woodward, and Manning were regular writers for the first season. Medical specialist and technical advisor Lance Gentile made his television writing debut in the first season. His first teleplay "Love's Labor Lost" won multiple Emmy Awards. Medical student Neal Baer was the season's other regular writer. Tracey Stern contributed the script for a single episode.

Producers Leder and Chulack were regular directors on the first season. Rod Holcomb directed the pilot episode and returned for a regular season episode. Charles Haid, Elodie Keene, and Fred Gerber also helmed multiple episodes. Film director Quentin Tarantino contributed a single episode. Other single episode directors include Mark Tinker, Vern Gillum, James Hayman, Daniel Sackheim, Félix Enríquez Alcalá, Anita Addison, James Hayman, and Donna Deitch.

Cast

Main cast
 Anthony Edwards as Dr. Mark Greene – Chief Resident
 George Clooney as Dr. Doug Ross – Pediatric Resident PGY-4
 Sherry Stringfield as Dr. Susan Lewis – Resident PGY-2
 Noah Wyle as John Carter – Third-year Medical Student
 Julianna Margulies as Nurse Carol Hathaway – Nurse Manager
 Eriq La Salle as Dr. Peter Benton – Surgical Resident PGY-2

Supporting cast
Doctors and Medical students

 William H. Macy as Dr. David Morgenstern – Chief of Surgery and Emergency Medicine
 Sam Anderson as Dr. Jack Kayson – Chief of Cardiology
 Amy Aquino as Dr. Janet Coburn – Chief of Obstetrics and Gynecology
 CCH Pounder as Dr. Angela Hicks – Surgical/Emergency Medical Attending Physician
 Ming-Na Wen as Deb Chen – Third-year Medical Student
 Michael Ironside as Dr. William "Wild Willy" Swift – Chief of Emergency Medicine
 Scott Jaeck as Dr. Steven Flint – Chief of Radiology
 Rick Rossovich as Dr. John "Tag" Taglieri – Orthopedist
 John Terry as Dr. David "Div" Cvetic – Psychiatrist
 Tyra Ferrell as Dr. Sarah Langworthy – Third Year Surgical Resident
 Perry Anzilotti as Dr. Ed – Anesthesiologist 
 Tobin Bell as Dr. Wertz – Hospital Administrator 
Patrick Collins as Dr. Netzley
Marion Yue as Dr. Sandra Li
 Matt Gottlieb	as Dr. Ashley
 Pierre Epstein as Dr. Alex Bradley - Chief of Staff

Nurses

 Ellen Crawford as Nurse Lydia Wright
Conni Marie Brazelton as Nurse Conni Oligario
 Deezer D as Nurse Malik McGrath
 Laura Ceron as Nurse Chuny Marquez
 Yvette Freeman as Nurse Haleh Adams
 Lily Mariye as Nurse Lily Jarvik
 Vanessa Marquez as Nurse Wendy Goldman
 Dinah Lenney as Nurse Shirley
 Suzanne Carney as OR Nurse Janet

Staff, Paramedics and Officers

 Gloria Reuben as Physical Therapist Jeanie Boulet
 Abraham Benrubi as Desk Clerk Jerry Markovic
 Glenn Plummer as Desk Clerk Timmy Rawlins
Rolando Molina as Desk Clerk Rolando
 Małgorzata Gebel as ER aide (Dr.) Bogdanilivestsky "Bob" Romansky
 Lisa Zane as Risk Management Diane Leeds
 Christine Healy as Hospital Administrator Harriet Spooner
Emily Wagner as Paramedic Doris Pickman
 Montae Russell as Paramedic Dwight Zadro
Lee R. Sellers as Chopper EMT
Mike Genovese as Officer Al Grabarsky
Rick Marzan as Camacho

Family

 Christine Harnos as Jennifer "Jenn" Greene
 Yvonne Zima as Rachel Greene
Georgiana Tarjan as Helen Hathaway
 Khandi Alexander as Jackie Robbins
 Ving Rhames as Walter Robbins
 Beah Richards as Mae Benton
 Tamala Jones as Joanie Robbins
 Mark Dakota Robinson as Steven Robbins
 Kathleen Wilhoite as Chloe Lewis
 Valerie Perrine as Cookie Lewis
 Zachary Browne as Jake Leeds
 Wolfgang Bodison as Al Boulet

Notable guest stars

 Andrea Parker as Linda Ferrell
 Miguel Ferrer as Mr. Parker
 Troy Evans as Officer Frank Martin 
 Liz Vassey as Liz
 John Randolph as Mr. Franks
John La Motta as Ivan Gregor
 Rosemary Clooney as Madam X/Mary Cavanaugh
 Alan Rosenberg as Samuel Gasner
 Vondie Curtis-Hall as Henry Colton/Rena
 Jessica Tandy as Mrs. Plecker
 Bobcat Goldthwait as Mr. Conally (voice only)
 Robert Carradine as John Koch
 Bradley Whitford as Sean O'Brien
 Colleen Flynn as Jodi O'Brien
 Kristin Davis as Leslie
 Garrett Morris as Edgar Luck
 Kevin Michael Richardson as Patrick

Episodes

Reception
Critical reactions for ERs first season were very favorable. Alan Rich, writing for Variety, praised the direction and editing of the pilot while Eric Mink, writing for the New York Daily News, said that the pilot of ER "was urban, emergency room chaos and young, committed doctors." However some reviewers felt the episodes following the pilot didn't live up to it with Mink commenting that "...the great promise of the "E.R." pilot dissolves into the kind of routine, predictable, sloppily detailed medical drama we've seen many times before."

Due to the show launching on NBC at the same time that CBS launched its own medical drama Chicago Hope, many critics drew comparisons between the two. Eric Mink concluded that ER may rate more highly in the Nielsens but Chicago Hope told better stories, while Rich felt both shows were "riveting, superior TV fare."

The show's first season won several major television awards. Julianna Margulies picked up an Emmy Award for Outstanding Supporting Actress in a Drama Series, while Mimi Leder won an Emmy for Outstanding Individual Achievement in Directing a Drama Series for the episode "Love's Labor Lost". "Love's Labor Lost" also picked up the 1995 Writers Guild of America Award for Episodic Drama and the 1995 American Cinema Editors Award. "Day One" picked up two awards for Cinematography at the American Society of Cinematographers Awards of 1994 while Charles Haid won the Directors Guild of America Award for Primetime Drama Series for the episode "Into that Good Night" with Rod Holcomb also picking up a Directors Guild Award in the Dramatic Specials category for his work on "24 Hours".

References

External links 
 

1994 American television seasons
1995 American television seasons
ER (TV series) seasons